The 2009–10 QMJHL season was the 41st season of the Quebec Major Junior Hockey League (QMJHL). The regular season, which consisted of eighteen teams playing 68 games each, began on September 10, 2009, and ended on March 14, 2010.

The 2009–10 QMJHL season marked the first time that an all-Maritime Provinces Championship series occurred in the 41-year history of the league.

Standings

Division standings

Overall standings
 determines standings for the second round of the playoffs.

R - Regular Season Champions

Z - team has clinched division

X - team clinched QMJHL Playoff spot

O - team DID NOT make Playoffs

Scoring leaders
Note: GP = Games played; G = Goals; A = Assists; Pts = Points; PIM = Penalty minutes

Leading goaltenders
Note: GP = Games played; TOI = Total ice time; W = Wins; L = Losses ; GA = Goals against; SO = Total shutouts; SV% = Save percentage; GAA = Goals against average

Players

2009 QMJHL Entry Draft
First round
 	Val-d'Or Foreurs 	 Olivier Archambault (LW)

2009 NHL Entry Draft
In total, 21 QMJHL players were selected at the 2009 NHL Entry Draft.

Subway Super Series
The Subway Super Series (formerly known as ADT Canada Russia Challenge) is a six-game series featuring four teams: three from the Canadian Hockey League (CHL) versus Russia's National Junior hockey team. Within the Canadian Hockey League umbrella, one team from each of its three leagues — the Ontario Hockey League, Quebec Major Junior Hockey League, and Western Hockey League — compete in two games against the Russian junior team.

The 2009 Subway Super Series was held in six cities across Canada, with two cities for each league within the Canadian Hockey League. The series begun on November 16, 2009, and concluded on November 26, 2009. Both Quebec Major Junior Hockey League games were held in the province of Quebec. Former Montreal Canadiens players, Guy Carbonneau and Guy Lafleur were named Honorary Captains for the first two games of the series, which was held in Drummondville on November 16, 2009, and Shawinigan on November 18, 2009.

All six games were televised nationwide on Rogers Sportsnet, which broadcast both games from the Quebec Major Junior Hockey League.

Results
In the first game of the two part series between Team QMJHL and Team Russia, Team QMJHL scored three goals en route to a 3–1 win in front of 2,234 fans at Centre Marcel Dionne in Drummondville, Quebec. Goaltender, Alexander Zalivin of Team Russia and forward Gabriel Bourque of Team QMJHL, were named Players of the Game for their respective teams. Two nights later at Centre Bionest in Shawinigan, Quebec, Team QMJHL defeated Team Russia 8–3 to give the CHL a 2–0 series lead. Denis Golubev was named Team Russia's Player of the Game, while Luke Adam was named Team QMJHL's Player of the Game.

QMJHL Playoffs

Overview

First round

Division Atlantique

(1A) Saint John Sea Dogs vs. (4A) P.E.I. Rocket

(2A) Moncton Wildcats vs. (3A) Cape Breton Screaming Eagles

Division Telus Centre

(1C) Drummondville Voltigeurs vs. (4C) Lewiston MAINEiacs

(2C) Victoriaville Tigres vs. (3C) Shawinigan Cataractes

Division Telus Est

(1E) Quebec Remparts vs. (5A) Acadie-Bathurst Titan

(2E) Rimouski Océanic vs. (3E) Chicoutimi Saguenéens

Division Telus Ouest

(1O) Rouyn-Noranda Huskies vs. (4O) Val-d'Or Foreurs

(2O) Montreal Junior Hockey Club vs. (3O) Gatineau Olympiques

Quarter-finals

(1) Saint John Sea Dogs vs. (12) Gatineau Olympiques

(2) Drummondville Voltigeurs vs. (9) Rimouski Océanic

(3) Quebec Remparts vs. (6) Victoriaville Tigres

(4) Rouyn-Noranda Huskies vs. (5) Moncton Wildcats

Semi-finals

(1) Saint John Sea Dogs vs. (6) Victoriaville Tigres

(2) Drummondville Voltigeurs vs. (5) Moncton Wildcats

QMJHL Championship

(1) Saint John Sea Dogs vs. (5) Moncton Wildcats

Memorial Cup

The 92nd MasterCard Memorial Cup was held in Brandon, Manitoba.

All-star teams
First team
 Goaltender - Jake Allen, Drummondville Voltigeurs
 Defence - David Savard, Moncton Wildcats & Joel Chouinard, Victoriaville Tigres
 Left winger - Mike Hoffman, Saint John Sea Dogs
 Centreman - Luke Adam, Cape Breton Screaming Eagles
 Right winger - Gabriel Dumont, Drummondville Voltigeurs

Second team
 Goaltender - Kevin Poulin, Victoriaville Tigres
 Defence - Brandon Gormley, Moncton Wildcats & Mark Barberio, Moncton Wildcats
 Left winger - Nicolas Deschamps, Moncton Wildcats
 Centreman - Sean Couturier, Drummondville Voltigeurs
 Right winger - Nicholas Petersen, Saint John Sea Dogs

Rookie team
 Goaltender - Robin Gusse, Chicoutimi Saguenéens
 Defence - Adam Polasek, P.E.I. Rocket & Xavier Ouellet, Montreal Junior Hockey Club
 Left winger - Stanislav Galiev, Saint John Sea Dogs
 Centreman - Alexandre Comtois, Drummondville Voltigeurs
 Right winger - Petr Straka, Rimouski Océanic

Trophies and awards
Team
President's Cup - Moncton Wildcats
Jean Rougeau Trophy - Regular Season Champions: Saint John Sea Dogs
Luc Robitaille Trophy - Team that scored the most goals: Saint John Sea Dogs
Robert Lebel Trophy - Team with best GAA: Moncton Wildcats

Player
Michel Brière Memorial Trophy - Most Valuable Player: Mike Hoffman, Saint John Sea Dogs
Jean Béliveau Trophy - Top Scorer: Sean Couturier, Drummondville Voltigeurs
Guy Lafleur Trophy - Playoff MVP : Gabriel Bourque, Moncton Wildcats
Jacques Plante Memorial Trophy - Jake Allen, Drummondville Voltigeurs
Guy Carbonneau Trophy - Best Defensive Forward: Gabriel Dumont, Drummondville Voltiguers
Emile Bouchard Trophy - Defenceman of the Year: David Savard, Moncton Wildcats
Kevin Lowe Trophy - Best Defensive Defenceman: David Savard, Moncton Wildcats
Mike Bossy Trophy - Brandon Gormley, Moncton Wildcats
RDS Cup - Rookie of the Year: Petr Straka, Rimouski Océanic
Michel Bergeron Trophy - Offensive Rookie of the Year: Petr Straka, Rimouski Océanic
Raymond Lagacé Trophy - Defensive Rookie of the Year: Robin Gusse, Chicoutimi Saguenéens
Frank J. Selke Memorial Trophy - Most sportsmanlike player: Mike Hoffman, Saint John Sea Dogs
QMJHL Humanitarian of the Year - Humanitarian of the Year: Nick MacNeil, Cape Breton Screaming Eagles
Marcel Robert Trophy - Best Scholastic Player: Dominic Jalbert, Chicoutimi Saguenéens
Paul Dumont Trophy - Personality of the Year: Joel Chouinard, Victoriaville Tigres

Executive
Ron Lapointe Trophy - Coach of the Year: Gerard Gallant, Saint John Sea Dogs
Maurice Filion Trophy - General Manager of the Year: Dominic Ricard, Drummondville Voltigeurs
John Horman Trophy - Executive of the Year: Kent Hudson, P.E.I. Rocket
Jean Sawyer Trophy - Marketing Director of the Year: Vicky Côté, Drummondville Voltigeurs

See also
 2010 Memorial Cup
 List of QMJHL seasons
 2009–10 OHL season
 2009–10 WHL season
 2009 NHL Entry Draft
 2009 in ice hockey
 2010 in ice hockey

References

External links
 Official QMJHL website
 Official CHL website

Quebec Major Junior Hockey League seasons
4